Tales of Mystery and Imagination (Edgar Allan Poe) is the debut studio album by British rock band The Alan Parsons Project. It was released on 25 June 1976 in the United Kingdom by Charisma Records. The lyrical and musical themes of the album, which are retellings of horror stories and poetry by Edgar Allan Poe, attracted a cult audience. The title of the album is taken from the title of a collection of Poe's macabre stories of the same name.

Musicians featured on the album include vocalists Arthur Brown of The Crazy World of Arthur Brown on "The Tell Tale Heart", John Miles on "The Cask of Amontillado" and "(The System of) Dr. Tarr and Professor Fether", and Terry Sylvester of The Hollies on "To One in Paradise". The complete line-up of bands Ambrosia and Pilot play on the record, along with keyboardist Francis Monkman of Curved Air and Sky.

Tales of Mystery and Imagination peaked at #38 on Billboard's Pop Albums chart. The song "(The System Of) Doctor Tarr and Professor Fether" peaked at No. 37 on the Pop Singles chart, and No. 62 in Canada.

Composition
"The Raven" features actor Leonard Whiting on lead vocals, with Alan Parsons performing vocals through an EMI vocoder. According to the album's liner notes, "The Raven" was the first rock song to feature a digital vocoder. The prelude section of "The Fall of the House of Usher", although uncredited, is taken verbatim from the opera fragment "La chute de la maison Usher" by Claude Debussy which was composed between 1908 and 1917. "The Fall of the House of Usher" is an instrumental suite that runs more than 15 minutes and takes up most of Side 2 of the recording.

Artwork
The album's cover art was made by Hipgnosis. Storm Thorgerson said that Eric Woolfson and Parsons wanted a "classy" design, including a book of lyrics, lengthy credits, and a chronology of Poe's life. He described the recurring image of the "taped" man:
Poe was preoccupied with entombment. Many of his characters have been incarcerated in some form or other – in coffins, brick walls, or under floorboards. We came up with the 'taped' man – a mummy-like figure who is wrapped, not in bandages, but in 2" recording tape. This motif is partially horror-like, as well as being 'entombed', and the 2" tape appropriately suggests that the album is done by a producer in a studio, as opposed to a band recording material they will play on stage. Although the clients were intrigued by this idea they did not desire a pictorial cover but preferred instead a precise graphic representation. The narrow strip of illustration from George [Hardie] shows a long shadow of the taped man.

The booklet (attached to the inside of the cover) is composed of photos related to the songs, and line drawings that explore the taped man as he thrashes about in his restricted world and strives to unravel himself. The illustrated capital letters continue the idea. The layout and drawings are by Colin Elgie. The sleeve is one of our better attempts at combining photographs and illustration.

Reception

Critical reaction to the album was mixed: Rolling Stone's Billy Altman concluded it did not completely accurately reproduce Poe's tension and macabre fear, ending by saying "devotees of Gothic literature will have to wait for someone with more of the macabre in their blood for a truer musical reading of Poe's often terrifying works." Nonetheless, the album has still garnered somewhat of a cult status amongst Alan Parsons Project fans. In July 2010, the album was named as one of Classic Rock magazine's "50 Albums That Built Prog Rock".

Reissues
Originally simply called The Alan Parsons Project, the album was successful enough to achieve gold status. The identity of The Alan Parsons Project as a group was cemented on the second album, I Robot, in 1977.

The original version of the album was available for several years on vinyl and cassette, but was not immediately available on CD (the CD technology not being commercially available until 1982).

In 1987, Parsons completely remixed the album, including additional keyboard and guitar passages and narration (by Orson Welles) as well as updating the production style to include heavy reverb and the gated reverb snare drum sound, which was popular in the 1980s. He also made the end of side A segue into the start of side B due to the remix of the album being released when CD's were commercially available, thus no need to stop playback to change sides. The CD notes that Welles never met Parsons or Eric Woolfson, but sent a tape to them of the performance shortly after the album was manufactured in 1976.

The first passage narrated by Welles on the 1987 remix (which comes before the first track, "A Dream Within a Dream") is sourced from an obscure nonfiction piece by Poe – No XVI of his Marginalia (from 1845 to 1849 Edgar Allan Poe titled some of his reflections and fragmentary material "Marginalia.") The second passage Welles reads (which comes before "The Fall of the House of Usher" (Prelude), seems to be a partial paraphrase or composite from nonfiction by Poe, chiefly from a collection of poems titled "Poems of Youth" by Poe (contained in "Introduction to Poems – 1831" in a section titled "Letter to Mr. B-----------"; the "Shadows of shadows passing" part of the quote comes from the Marginalia.
 
In 1994, Mobile Fidelity Sound Lab (MFSL) released the original 1976 version on CD (UDCD-606), making the original available digitally for the first time.

In 2007, a Deluxe Edition released by Universal Music included both the 1976 and the 1987 versions remastered by Alan Parsons during 2006 with eight additional bonus tracks.

In 2016, a 40th Anniversary Edition 3CD/1BD was released, featuring both 2007 Deluxe Edition CDs, a third disc with demos, outtakes, and other tracks, and a Blu-ray featuring a 5.1 surround sound version of the album remixed by Alan Parsons in 2016.

 Remakes 

A variant of the song "The Raven" appears on the Eric Woolfson album Edgar Allan Poe (2009), which contains the complete music from Woolfson's 2003 stage musical of the same name. The variant track does not appear on Woolfson's 2003 CD Poe: More Tales of Mystery and Imagination, which was a highly abridged version of the stage musical. On the variant, the bass line and keyboard chords of the original Tales of Mystery and Imagination track are heard, but they are quieter, do not feature a vocoder, and instead of an abridged version of the Poe poem being sung, the Woolfson version features a fuller spoken dramatic reading of the poem. The Alan Parsons album A Valid Path includes "A Recurring Dream Within a Dream", a composite of "A Dream Within a Dream" and "The Raven" incorporating electronic music influences.

Slough Feg covered "The Tell-Tale Heart" for their 2010 album The Animal Spirits''.

Track listing

Orson Welles' narration does not appear on the original 1976 mix of the album. It does, however, on the 1987 remix: specifically on "A Dream Within a Dream", and on the extended Prelude of "The Fall of the House of Usher".

2007 deluxe edition
Disc 1: Tracks 1–11, original album in original 1976 mix
"The Raven" (original demo)
"Edgar" (demo of an unreleased track)
"Orson Welles Radio Spot"
"Interview with Alan Parsons and Eric Woolfson" (1976)

Disc 2: Tracks 1–11, original album in 1987 remix
"Eric's Guide Vocal Medley"
"Orson Welles Dialogue"
<LI>"Sea Lions in the Departure Lounge" (sound effects and experiments)
"GBH Mix" (unreleased experiments)

Personnel
Track numbers in parenthesis.
Alan Parsons – EMI vocoder , Projectron synthesizer , recorder , additional vocals , synthesizer , cathedral organ  producer, engineer
Eric Woolfson – keyboards , backing vocals , harpsichord , organ , additional vocals , synthesizer  executive producer
Andrew Powell – orchestral arrangement , orchestral conductor , keyboards , organ 
Francis Monkman – organ , harpsichord 
Billy Lyall – keyboards , recorder , piano , Fender Rhodes electric piano , glockenspiel 
Christopher North – keyboards 
Orson Welles – narration 
Leonard Whiting – lead vocals , narration 
Arthur Brown – lead vocals 
John Miles – lead vocals , electric guitar 
Jack Harris – additional vocals 
Terry Sylvester – additional vocals , lead vocals 
Jane Powell – backing vocals 
Smokey Parsons – vocals
Bob Howes & the English Chorale – choir 
Westminster City School Boys Choir – choir 
David Paton – acoustic guitar , backing vocals , bass guitar 
Kevin Peek – acoustic guitar 
Laurence Juber – acoustic guitar 
Ian Bairnson – electric guitar , acoustic guitar 
David Pack – electric guitar 
Joe Puerta – bass guitar 
Les Hurdle – bass guitar 
Daryl Runswick – double bass 
David Katz – violin, orchestra leader , orchestra contractor
Jack Rothstein – orchestra leader 
David Snell – harp 
Hugo D'Alton – mandolin 
Stuart Tosh – drums , timpani , backwards cymbals 
Burleigh Drummond – drums 
John Leach – cimbalom , kantele

Production staff 
Gordon Parry – engineer
Tony Richards – assistant engineer
Chris Blair – assistant engineer
Tom Trefethen – assistant engineer
Pat Stapley – assistant engineer
Peter Christopherson – photography
Aubrey Powell – photography
Storm Thorgerson – photography
Sam Emerson – photography
Hipgnosis – design, cover art
Colin Elgie – artwork, graphic design, layout design

Charts

Weekly charts

Year-end charts

Certifications

See also
Edgar Allan Poe and music
"A Dream Within A Dream"
"The Raven"
"The Tell-Tale Heart"
"The Cask of Amontillado"
"The System of Doctor Tarr and Professor Fether"
"The Fall of the House of Usher"

References

The Alan Parsons Project albums
20th Century Fox Records albums
1976 debut albums
Albums with cover art by Hipgnosis
Concept albums
Albums produced by Alan Parsons
Charisma Records albums
Mercury Records albums
Music based on works by Edgar Allan Poe